Stepkovo is a rural locality (a village) in Posyolok Nikologory, Vyaznikovsky District, Vladimir Oblast, Russia. The population was 17 as of 2010.

Geography 
Stepkovo is located 23 km southwest of Vyazniki (the district's administrative centre) by road. Yerofeyevo is the nearest rural locality.

References 

Rural localities in Vyaznikovsky District